A maritime disaster is an event which usually involves a ship or ships and can involve military action. Because of the nature of maritime travel, there is often a substantial loss of life. This list covers those disasters where 30 or more lives were lost.

Peacetime disasters

Many maritime disasters happen outside the realms of war. All ships, including those of the military, are vulnerable to problems from weather conditions, faulty design or human error. Some of the disasters below occurred in periods of conflict, although their losses were unrelated to any military action. The table listings are in descending order of the magnitude of casualties suffered.

Wartime disasters

Disasters with high losses of life can occur in times of armed conflict. Shown below are some of the known events with major losses.

See also
 List of maritime disasters
 List of maritime disasters in the 18th century
 List of maritime disasters in the 20th century
 List of maritime disasters in World War I
 List of maritime disasters in World War II
 List of maritime disasters in the 21st century
 Shipwreck
 List of shipwrecks
 List of disasters
 List of accidents and disasters by death toll
 List by death toll of ships sunk by submarines
 List of RORO vessel accidents

References

Lists of shipwrecks
19th century-related lists